Rose Wélépa (born 19 January 1986) is a New Caledonian Paralympic athlete who competes in discus throw, javelin throw and shot put events representing France in international level events.

References

External links 
 
 

1986 births
Living people
People from Nouméa
Paralympic athletes of France
French female discus throwers
French female javelin throwers
French female shot putters
Athletes (track and field) at the 2012 Summer Paralympics
Athletes (track and field) at the 2016 Summer Paralympics